The Belinski–Zakharov (inverse) transform is a nonlinear transformation that generates new exact solutions of the vacuum Einstein's field equation. It was developed by Vladimir Belinski and Vladimir Zakharov in 1978. The Belinski–Zakharov transform is a generalization of the inverse scattering transform. The solutions produced by this transform are called gravitational solitons (gravisolitons). Despite the term 'soliton' being used to describe gravitational solitons, their behavior is very different from other (classical) solitons. In particular, gravitational solitons do not preserve their amplitude and shape in time, and up to June 2012 their general interpretation remains unknown. What is known however, is that most black holes (and particularly the Schwarzschild metric and the Kerr metric) are special cases of gravitational solitons.

Introduction 
The Belinski–Zakharov transform works for spacetime intervals of the form

It is assumed that both the function  and the matrix  depend on the coordinates  and  only. Despite being a specific form of the spacetime interval that depends only on two variables, it includes a great number of interesting solutions a special cases, such as the Schwarzschild metric, the Kerr metric, Einstein–Rosen metric, and many others.

In this case, Einstein's vacuum equation  decomposes into two sets of equations for the matrix  and the function . Using light-cone coordinates , the first equation for the matrix  is

The second set of equations is

Taking the trace of the matrix equation for  reveals that in fact  satisfies the wave equation

The Lax pair 
Consider the linear operators  defined by

where  is an auxiliary complex spectral parameter.
A simple computation shows that since  satisfies the wave equation, . This pair of operators commute, this is the Lax pair.

The gist behind the inverse scattering transform is rewriting the nonlinear Einstein equation as an overdetermined linear system of equation for a new matrix function . Consider the Belinski–Zakharov equations:

As for the right-hand side, a short computation shows that indeed it vanishes as well precisely when  satisfies the nonlinear matrix Einstein equation.

This means that the overdetermined linear Belinski–Zakharov equations are solvable simultaneously exactly when  solves the nonlinear matrix equation . Actually, one can easily restore  from the matrix-valued function  by a simple limiting process.

Thus a solution of the nonlinear  equation is obtained from a solution of the linear Belinski–Zakharov equation by a simple evaluation

References

Exact solutions in general relativity